Brian "Beano" McDonald (born 7 June 1980) is a Gaelic football and former player for Laois. He resides in Killeen, County Laois, his club is Arles–Killeen. 

Known as "Beano", McDonald was one of the top scorers in 2003 All-Ireland Senior Football Championship. He represented Ireland in the 2003 International Rules Series. He scored both goals and overs to win against Australia but Ireland ultimately lost the Series that year. 

In 2021 Billy Sheehan chose him as a Laois senior football selector.

Career
Brian has been a fan and fellow player favourite over the years both on and off the pitch, mentioned time and time again as a player with legendary status. 

By 17 "Beano" was lining out for Club and County, winning two All Ireland Football Championship Minor titles  , three minor Leinster Championship titles  and making his senior championship debut while still playing minor in 1998. 

McDonald was one week off sitting his leaving certificate when called up to play his debut senior championship clash against Westmeath, scoring to help Laois secure a place in the semi-final against kildare. 

A month earlier in May 1998 McDonald lined out for Laois Under 21’s bringing them all the way to an All Ireland under 21’s final against Kerry and later in the same year lining out for Laois Minors against Tyrone in the All Ireland Minor championship final 

In 2003, Under the leadership of Kerry GAA legend Mick O'Dwyer McDonald enjoyed success again with his native Laois winning the Leinster senior football championship against Kildare scoring 1-2. 

Since his days on the field McDonald has filled key selector roles with Laois Minors and Coaching selector role with Laois Senior football. 

Brian ‘Beano’ McDonald has been a firm favourite of players and fans over the years and most recently being mentioned in the 2022 Kerry V Galway All Ireland Match Day programme along with fellow Laois Legends Fergal Byron , Martin Dempsey, Joe Higgins, Tom Kelly  , Colm Browne , Bobby Miller, John O’Loughlin , Mick Lawlor , Tom Prendergast and Ian Fitzgerald. 

Alan Costello on his favourite 15 players

“Brian Mc Donald 

UCD: Had balance,an awareness of space and a great eye for goal.

Oozed class. Could kick well off both feet and was very good with his back to goal in bringing other teammates into the play. A really nice fella.

An All-Ireland double Minor winner with Laois and played Senior for many years winning a Leinster championship under Mick O' Dwyer. Played a pivotal role in the defeat of our Mayo Minor team in the 1997 All-Ireland semi-final in Croke Park bagging two goals in that game.

Played Minor for three years in a row with Laois, 96, 97 and 98. A rare achievement. Went on to play compromise rules for Ireland.” 

Laoistoday.ie 

In 2020 Select their 20 best players over the past 20 years 

Another of the certainties, Beano was a class act in a Laois jersey from the moment he arrived on the scene as a 16-year-old on the All Ireland minor winning team in 1996.

Not the biggest, strongest or fastest but just an out an out forward, blessed with wonderful vision, timing and an eye for goal. At his peak in 2003 when he was Laois’s top scorer with 2-19 (with almost all of it from play), he was nominated for an All Star and played for Ireland in the International Rules that same season.

He made his senior debut when still a minor in 1998 (in a season when he played in All Ireland minor and U-21 finals) and made a total of 36 appearances in the 2000s, the last coming as a sub in an All Ireland Qualifier loss to Down in Newry in 2009.

Suffered an horrific leg break in the 2004 Qualifier defeat to Tyrone and though he recovered in time for the 2005 season, it wasn’t until 2006 that he was back to his best and enjoyed another fantastic spell of form in what was Micko’s final year.

A firm favourite with the fans and one of the first names you think of when you recall that Leinster winning team of 2003.

McDonald is one of the few players to obtain 3 All Ireland minor medals in 1996, 1997 and 1998 for his native county Laois. 

Brian McDonald was shortlisted for a Vodafone All Star award in 2003 

He joined the Laois backroom team as a coach (alongside Chris Conway) under Billy Sheehan, who was appointed manager in October 2021.

Personal
Brian attended secondary school at Knockbeg College, in 2001 he went on to study for a Bachelor of Agricultural Science in UCD School of Agriculture and Food Science in University College Dublin.

Brian is a farmer in County Laois, where he breeds thoroughbred race horses. 

Brian has one child; a daughter born in 2021.

Honours
Club
 3 Laois Intermediate Football Championship
 1 Dublin Senior Football Championship 
 Laois Senior Football Championship final 2006

College
While attending University College Dublin, he played for UCD in the 2001 Sigerson Cup championship, losing the final to Ulster University.

Inter-county
 1 Leinster Senior Football Championship 2003
 1 Leinster Under-21 Football Championship 1998
 3 Leinster Minor Football Championship 1996, 1997, 1998
 2 All-Ireland Minor Football Championship 1996, 1997
 All-Ireland Minor Football Championship final 1998

References

External links
 Keane, Paul. "Beano McDonald: I struggled with hype of Laois glory days". Irish Examiner. 20 May 2020.
 https://www.laoistoday.ie/2021/01/03/2020-remembered-our-selection-of-the-best-laois-football-team-of-the-past-20-years/
 https://www.irishexaminer.com/sport/gaa/arid-10075467.html
 https://www.hoganstand.com/article/index/36334
 https://www.thefreelibrary.com/GAA%3A+BRADLEY+STARS+AS+UUJ%27S+WAIT+IS+OVER%3B+SIGERSON+CUP+FINAL+-...-a073099752
 David Clifford chasing 3 All Ireland Minor Medal, last achieved by Beano McDonald in 1998https://www.irishnews.com/sport/gaafootball/2017/08/31/news/dublin-stars-coule-perhaps-learn-off-david-clifford-1124561/
 https://www.balls.ie/gaa/gaa-players-unfulfilled-potential-383808
 All Star awards 2003 https://www.irishtimes.com/sport/2003-football-all-star-nominees-1.384196

1980 births
Living people
Arles-Killeen Gaelic footballers
Gaelic football coaches
Gaelic football forwards
Irish international rules football players
Laois inter-county Gaelic footballers